Brad Prowly aka "Super Bad Brad" (born 1962) is a New York City street performer frequently appearing in the Greenwich Village area, performing R&B classics with the aid of a boombox and microphone.

In 2001 Brad toured Europe as the opening act for The Fun Lovin' Criminals.

In 2003, he appeared in a short film titled Karaoke Man by Adolfo Doring, in which he narrates while being followed to his "place of work" on the streets.

In 2005, he appeared at the Apollo Theater performing "Let's Get It On", originally by Marvin Gaye, in which he received a standing ovation.

In addition, he performed regularly at the Belmar Irish Pub in Binghamton, New York, in August and September 2009.  Following his stay in Binghamton he traveled to Boston, Massachusetts, where he has been spotted singing outside the Berklee College of Music as recently as October 2009. 

The 2006 music video for the Republic of Loose song "The Idiots", features Brad Prowly, as a street performer, busking the song to an audience.

He stars in The Killers' music video for their 2010 Christmas song "Boots", directed by Jared Hess (Napoleon Dynamite).

External links
Official website

Video Links
Karaoke Man
"Let's Get it On" Live at the Apollo Theater
Performing "Let's Get It On" by Marvin Gaye
Performing "You'll Never Find" by Lou Rawls
Performing "Kung Fu Fighting" by Carl Douglas
Performing "For The Love Of Money" by The O'Jays
Performing "Anarchy in the U.K" by the Sex Pistols
A compilation of songs performed on Mar 11, 2011 (14mins)
Performing outside Berklee College of Music on October 20, 2009
Brad Prowly sings Michael Jackson's Ben
Crying (Roy Orbison) Boston June 18, 2010
Republic of Loose - The Idiots - Director Adolfo Doring

American street performers
1962 births
Living people